Nina Vasilyevna Gavrylyuk (born 13 April 1965) is a former Soviet (until 1991) and Russian cross-country skier who competed from 1987 to 2003. Born in Leningrad, she won four medals at the Winter Olympics with three golds (4 × 5 km relay: 1988, 1994, 1998) and one bronze (15 km: 1994).

In Soviet time she trained at VSS Trud in Leningrad. Gavrylyuk's biggest success was at the FIS Nordic World Ski Championships, where she earned eleven medals. This included six golds (4 × 5 km relay: 1987, 1993, 1995, 1997, 1999, 2001), three silvers (5 km: 1995, 5 km + 10 km combined pursuit: 1995, 1999), and two bronzes (5 km + 10 km combined pursuit: 1997, 4 × 5 km relay: 2003.

She also won the 30 km event at the Holmenkollen Ski Festival in 1996.

Cross-country skiing results
All results are sourced from the International Ski Federation (FIS).

Olympic Games
4 medals – (4 gold, 1 bronze)

World Championships
 11 medals – (6 gold, 3 silver, 2 bronze)

a.  Cancelled due to extremely cold weather.

World Cup

Season standings

Individual podiums

5 victories  
35 podiums

Team podiums

 31 victories – (31 ) 
 42 podiums – (40 , 2 ) 

Note:   Until the 1999 World Championships and the 1994 Olympics, World Championship and Olympic races were included in the World Cup scoring system.

References

External links
 
 
 
  

1965 births
Cross-country skiers at the 1988 Winter Olympics
Cross-country skiers at the 1994 Winter Olympics
Cross-country skiers at the 1998 Winter Olympics
Cross-country skiers at the 2002 Winter Olympics
Holmenkollen Ski Festival winners
Living people
Olympic cross-country skiers of the Soviet Union
Olympic cross-country skiers of Russia
Olympic gold medalists for the Soviet Union
Olympic gold medalists for Russia
Olympic bronze medalists for Russia
Russian female cross-country skiers
Soviet female cross-country skiers
Sportspeople from Saint Petersburg
Olympic medalists in cross-country skiing
FIS Nordic World Ski Championships medalists in cross-country skiing
Medalists at the 1998 Winter Olympics
Medalists at the 1994 Winter Olympics
Medalists at the 1988 Winter Olympics